The men's halfpipe competition of the Sochi 2014 Olympics was held at Rosa Khutor Extreme Park on 11 February 2014.

The gold was won by Swiss Iouri Podladtchikov, who was followed by two Japanese snowboarders, the 15-year-old Ayumu Hirano in silver and Taku Hiraoka in bronze.

Qualification

An athlete must have placed in the top 30 in at a World Cup event after July 2012 or at the 2013 World Championships and a minimum of 100 FIS points. A total of 40 quota spots are available to athletes to compete at the games. A maximum of 4 athletes can be entered by a National Olympic Committee.

Schedule
All times are (UTC+4).

Results

Qualification
The qualification was held at 14:00.

QF – Qualify directly to final; QS – Qualify to semifinal; DNS – Did not start

Semifinals
The semifinals was held at 16:00.

Final
The final was held at 18:30.

Notes
a  Scherrer suffered a tear in his right ankle during warm-up and had to pull out of the semifinals.

References

Men's snowboarding at the 2014 Winter Olympics